Abdel Lamanje (born 27 July 1990) is a French footballer who plays as a left back or centre back.

Career

Club
Lamanje made his debut in the FNL for FC Shinnik Yaroslavl on 19 August 2011 in a game against FC Baltika Kaliningrad.

On 20 January 2016, Lamanje signed for Kazakhstan Premier League side FC Atyrau on a one-year contract, signing for fellow Kazakhstan Premier League team FC Kaisar on 16 January 2017.

On 24 January 2020, Lamanje signed for Shakhter Karagandy.

On 15 July 2021, Lamanje returned to Shakhter Karagandy.

Career statistics

References

1990 births
Living people
French footballers
French expatriate footballers
Ligue 2 players
Russian First League players
Kazakhstan Premier League players
Grenoble Foot 38 players
FC Shinnik Yaroslavl players
FC Rotor Volgograd players
FC Atyrau players
FC Kaisar players
FC Shakhter Karagandy players
Liga I players
FC Astra Giurgiu players
French expatriate sportspeople in Russia
French expatriate sportspeople in Kazakhstan
French expatriate sportspeople in Romania
Expatriate footballers in Russia
Expatriate footballers in Kazakhstan
Expatriate footballers in Romania
Association football defenders